Yoon Ye-jin (Hangul: 윤예진; born May 24, 1991), better known by her stage name Nada (나다) is a South Korean rapper and singer. She is a former member of the girl group Wassup. Nada made her debut as a soloist on December 22, 2016 with the digital single "Seorae Village".

Personal life 
Nada was born as Yoon Ye-ji in Seoul, South Korea, She studied at Sunhwa Arts School.

Nada was dating Kirk Kim who is 14 years her senior since 2017, Kim is the ceo of the record label Cycadelic Records in Compton, Los Angeles. which has been run by his family for 2 generations, he also runs a nightclub called Club Compton in Itaewon, South Korea. in November 2018, reports revealed that Kim and Nada had officially broke up. and the reason for the broke up was due to their different schedule that created distance between them, as Nada's agency Ground Zero said that "Nada is promoting in South Korea and Kirk Kim is in the United States, so the long distance was difficult. They naturally drifted apart and decided to remain good friends".

Career

2013–2016: Debut with Wassup and solo activities 
In 2013, Nada become a member of the girl group Wassup under Mafia Records, she was the main rapper of the group. Nada participated in Mnet’s rap competition TV show, Show Me the Money 3 as a contestant until round 3, On February 2, 2016 Nada released her 1st mixtape Homework. In July 2016, Nada become a contestant in Mnet's female rapper competition show Unpretty Rapstar 3, she lost out to Giant Pink in the finals with 131 votes.

On October 28, 2016, Nada was chosen as the new model for fitness brand Reebok korea's women's campaign '#PERFECTNEVER'. The campaign supports "women who are endlessly challenged by themselves, rejecting the limits of perfection". November 3, Mafia Records announced that Nada will be releasing a solo single but the company has yet to specify a specific release date. on December 18, the teaser image for her solo single "Seorae Village" was released, the teaser of the music video was released on December 21. the song along with its music video was released on December 22.

2017–2019: Leaving Wassup, It's Okay to Be a Little Crazy and collaboration 
On February 1, 2017, it was announced that Nada had officially left Wassup after a dispute with the Mafia Records. then Nada signed a contract with Ground Zero and on September 27, she made her first comeback after leaving Wassup with the single "Trippin". On October 28, Nada was the cast member of SBS's variety show It's Okay to Be a Little Crazy,

On January 12, 2018, Nada released "Ride", featuring Sumin. On May 30, 2018, Nada and Mina Myoung of 1MILLION Dance Studio collaborate on a reality show about music called Never Sleep, it premiered on mobile contents service app oksusu on June 5. The two also collaborate on a digital single called MND Project, released on June 15, 2018. With the song "Dozer". The music video of "Dozer" was directed by TW from the company OVIS and the music video was also produced by OVIS theirself. in August 2019, the Brazilian girl group EVE released the single "Oy Mama", which featured Nada.

2020–present: "My Body" and Miss Back 
On April 17, 2020 World Star Entertainment announced that Nada will made her first comeback in 2 years. the teaser image of her comeback with the song "My Body" was released on June 19, the song was released along with its music video on June 25. Nada also participated in the song as a songwriter and producer. She promoted the song in several music programs.

On September 3, Nada joined MBN's reality-variety show Miss Back. The show revolves around many female singers who debuted previously in girl groups, but slowly faded away from the limelight. On November 20, Nada released "Piggyback Ride" featuring singer Raina. On July 13, 2021, she announced her new single "Spicy", her first release in a year. "Spicy" was released along with its music video on July 31, 2021. On November 29, 2021, Nada release the single "Bulletproof".

Discography

Mixtape

Singles

Solo

As a featured artist

Collaborations

Participation on Albums

Filmography

Tv series

Tv show

References

External links 

Living people
Musicians from Seoul
South Korean female idols
South Korean women singers
South Korean female models
South Korean women rappers
1991 births